Winlaton is a locality located in the Rural City of Swan Hill, Victoria, Australia. The post office there opened on 17 October 1927 and was closed on 31 October 1944.

References

Towns in Victoria (Australia)
Rural City of Swan Hill